Alpine Skiing at the 1984 Winter Olympics consisted of six alpine skiing events, held 13–19 February in Sarajevo, Yugoslavia. The men's races were at Bjelašnica and the women's at Jahorina. Due to weather delays (a blizzard), both downhill races were postponed several days and run after the giant slalom races.

This was the first Winter Olympics since 1936 which did not also serve as the world championships for alpine skiing. It was the last Olympic program with just six events for alpine skiing; ten events were held in 1988 with the return of the combined event and the addition of Super G.

Banned from competition at these Olympics by the International Ski Federation (FIS) were top World Cup racers Ingemar Stenmark of Sweden and Hanni Wenzel of Liechtenstein, both double gold medalists at the  1980 Winter Olympics and leading the World Cup in 1984. They had accepted promotional payments directly, rather than through their national ski federations. Also absent was Marc Girardelli, who had not yet gained his citizenship from Luxembourg and was not allowed to compete for his native Austria.

Medal summary
Eight nations won medals in alpine skiing, and the United States led the medal table with three gold and two silver. Perrine Pelen was the only racer to win multiple medals, taking a silver and a bronze.

Host nation Yugoslavia won its first alpine medal in the Winter Olympics with Jure Franko's silver in the men's giant slalom. Czechoslovakia's medal, won by Olga Charvátová in the women's downhill, was its only Olympic medal ever won in alpine skiing.

Medal table

Source:

Men's events

Source:

Women's events

Source:

Course information 

Source:

Participating nations
Forty-two nations sent alpine skiers to compete in the events in Sarajevo. Egypt, Mexico, Monaco and Senegal made their Olympic alpine skiing debuts. Below is a list of the competing nations; in parentheses are the number of national competitors.

See also
Alpine skiing at the 1984 Winter Paralympics

References

External links
FIS-Ski.com – 1984 Winter Olympics – Alpine skiing

 
1984 Winter Olympics events
Alpine skiing at the Winter Olympics
Olympics
Alpine skiing competitions in Yugoslavia